Dawson's may refer to:

 Dawson's Cove, a settlement on Connaigre Bay, Newfoundland, Canada
 Dawson's integral or function, a mathematical function used in computer calculation to avoid arithmetic overflow

See also
 Dawson's 19th Arkansas Infantry Regiment, a Confederate military unit during the American Civil War
 Dawson's Burrowing Bee (Amegilla dawsoni), an insect species native to Western Australia 
 Dawson's caribou (Rangifer tarandus dawsoni), an extinct island subspecies that lived in British Columbia, Canada
 Dawson's cat shark (Bythaelurus dawsoni), a shark species found in waters around New Zealand
 Dawson's Chess, a derivative of Hexapawn, a deterministic two-player game invented by Martin Gardner
 Dawson's Creek, an American teen television drama, originally broadcast 1998–2003
 Dawson's dawn-man or Piltdown Man, a 1912 paleoanthropological hoax
 Dawson's encephalitis, a rare form of brain inflammation
 Dawson's Field hijackings, a 1970 terrorist incident
 Dawson's fingers, lesions around the ventricle-based brain veins of patients with multiple sclerosis
 "Dawson's Geek", a song on the 2002 Busted album Busted
 Dawson's magnolia (Magnolia dawsoniana), a species of tree native to China
 Dawson's wattle (Acacia dawsonii), a species of shrub native to Australia 
 Dawson's Weekly, a British series of comedy plays
 Dawson (disambiguation)